Vojko Obersnel (born 25 March 1957) is a Croatian politician who served as Mayor of Rijeka from 2000 to 2021.

Early life 
Obersnel was born in Rijeka, where he went to the primary school and gymnasium. As he never attended kindergarten he spent a lot of time with his grandparents in Bribir. Obersnel started his education at the Slaviša Vajner Čiča elementary school, in third grade moved to Bobijevo elementary school, and ultimately to Vladimir Gortan elementary school. At the age of 15-16, Obersnel enjoyed TV program Kuda idu divlje svinje, as well as comedies of Miodrag Petrović Čkalja and Mija Aleksić. His father born in Maribor, was a football player at NK Maribor. Vojko was strongly influenced by his partition in scouts movement. During his university studies he visited mountains in Croatia as well as in the rest of Yugoslavia. Obersnel graduated in 1980 at the Zagreb Faculty of Science. He is holding the title master of medicine genetics. From 1982 to 1997 he worked at the Rijeka Faculty of Medicine, where he taught biology and medical genetics. He also engaged in scientific and research work in the field of medical genetics and ecotoxicology and performed diagnostics in the cytogenetic laboratory.

Since 1983 he is married to Branka Obersnel, who is a pediatrician. They together have a son, Ognjen, born 1984, who is a graduate economist.

Political career 
Obersnel has been a member of the Social Democratic Party (SDP) since 1990. From 1997 to 2000 he was a member of the executive council of the City of Rijeka and head of the Department of Health and Social Welfare. In those years, Rijeka significantly expanded the social program which encompasses a large number of different forms of assistance. Actively participating in the World Health Organization project Obersnel project has enabled Rijeka to enter the European National Healthy Cities Network.

Mayor of Rijeka (2000–2021) 
He became the mayor of Rijeka on 2 March 2000 when the former mayor Slavko Linić was elected as deputy prime minister in the Ivica Račan government. Obersnel has so far been elected four times as mayor of Rijeka, in 2001, 2005, 2009, when he won in the first round with 58.27 per cent of the votes cast in the first direct elections and in 2013, when he won in the second round with 67.67 per cent of the votes cast.

In 2017, Obersnel has decided to run for his sixth and final term as mayor of Rijeka. In the first round of the mayoral election held on 21 May 2017, he won by a large margin, winning 40.88 per cent of the votes cast, but not winning an absolute majority, so the second round was held on 4 June, in which he won with a large majority of 55.59 per cent of the vote.

References 

1957 births
Living people
Mayors of Rijeka
Faculty of Science, University of Zagreb alumni
Social Democratic Party of Croatia politicians
League of Communists of Croatia politicians